The Housing and Planning Act 1986 is an Act of Parliament in the United Kingdom. It gave councils the option of transferring their housing stock to another landlord, such as a Registered Social Landlord (RSL).

References

Housing in the United Kingdom